The eighteenth season of the Case Closed anime was directed by Kōjin Ochi and produced by TMS Entertainment and Yomiuri Telecasting Corporation. The series is based on Gosho Aoyama's Case Closed manga series. In Japan, the series is titled  but was changed due to legal issues with the title Detective Conan. The series focuses on the adventures of teenage detective Shinichi Kudo who was turned into a child by a poison called APTX 4869, but continues working as a detective under the alias Conan Edogawa.

The episodes use eight pieces of theme music: four opening themes and four ending themes. The first opening theme is "Revive" by Mai Kuraki until episode 529. The second opening theme beginning episode 530 is "Everlasting Luv" by Breakerz until 546. The third opening beginning with episode 547 is "Magic" by Rina Aiuchi is used up to episode 564. The fourth opening theme is "As the Dew" by Garnet Crow and used for the final episode of the season. The second ending theme beginning episode 530 is "Doing all right" by Garnet Crow until episode 539. Starting from episode 562, the ending theme "Hello Mr. My Yesterday" by Hundred Percent Free is used onwards.

The season began airing on February 9, 2009 through February 7, 2010 on Nippon Television Network System in Japan. The season was later collected and released in ten DVD compilations by Shogakukan between October 23, 2009 and October 22, 2010, in Japan.


Episode list

References

2009 Japanese television seasons
2010 Japanese television seasons
Season18